Jason Gervais (born 18 January 1976) is a Canadian athlete. He competed in the men's discus throw at the 2000 Summer Olympics.

References

External links
 

1976 births
Living people
Athletes (track and field) at the 2000 Summer Olympics
Canadian male discus throwers
Olympic track and field athletes of Canada
Sportspeople from Timmins